Musk is a locality in central Victoria, Australia in the Hepburn Shire local government area,  north-west of the state capital, Melbourne.

Musk Creek Post Office opened around March 1879, was renamed Musk in 1937 and closed in 1974.

References

See also
 Musk railway station

Towns in Victoria (Australia)